Tait Glacier is a glacier about 4 nautical miles (7 km) long on the southwest coast of James Ross Island, flowing southwest into Carlsson Bay. Probably first seen by Dr. Otto Nordenskjold in 1903. Surveyed by Falkland Islands Dependencies Survey (FIDS) in 1945. Named by United Kingdom Antarctic Place-Names Committee (UK-APC) for Murdo F. Tait, FIDS meteorological observer at Hope Bay in 1952 and 1953.

See also
 List of glaciers in the Antarctic
 Glaciology

References
 
 

Glaciers of James Ross Island